Computational Materials Science is a monthly peer-reviewed scientific journal published by Elsevier. It was established in October 1992. The editor-in-chief is Susan Sinnott. The journal covers computational modeling and practical research for advanced materials and their applications.

Abstracting and indexing
The journal is abstracted and indexed by:

According to the Journal Citation Reports, the journal has a 2020 impact factor of 3.3.

References

External links

Materials science journals
Publications established in 1994
Monthly journals
English-language journals
Elsevier academic journals